Irvinestown St Molaise is a Gaelic football club based in Irvinestown, County Fermanagh, Northern Ireland.

History
The club was founded in 1906, and has won the Fermanagh Senior Football Championship twice. The club completed a league and championship double in 1952, going the year unbeaten.

The club's most recent success in championship came in 2015, winning the Fermanagh Intermediate title. Irvinestown reached the Intermediate final again in 2018, but lost to Belnaleck.

Honours
 Fermanagh Senior Football Championship (2): 1918, 1952
 Fermanagh Intermediate Football Championship (5): 1964, 2001, 2004, 2011, 2015
 Fermanagh Junior Football Championship (2): 1982, 1987

References

Gaelic football clubs in County Fermanagh
Gaelic games clubs in County Fermanagh